A running board or footboard is a narrow step fitted under the side doors of a tram (cable car, trolley, or streetcar in North America), car, or truck. It aids entry, especially into high vehicles, and is typical of vintage trams and cars, which had much higher ground clearances than today's vehicles. It is also used as a fashion statement on vehicles that would not otherwise require it. The origin of the name running board is obscure; the first running boards predate automobiles and were installed on carriages as early as the 17th century.

History

Rail

The term also applied to the walkways on top of railway/railroad boxcars.  Originally, they were used by brakemen to travel from car to car to apply hand-operated brakes.  With the adoption of the air brake this practice was abandoned. However the running board was still used as an observation point to pass hand signals to the train driver (train engineer in North America) when cars were being shunted (switched in North America).  The increased use of radio communication made this unnecessary.  Today, in most countries, it is forbidden for anyone to be on top of a freight car while the train is in motion.

Automobile

In the early 20th century, all automobiles were equipped with running boards. The necessity of using them was caused by the fact that first cars were designed with a narrow, high body bolted to the chassis. Most roads were unpaved and tall narrow wheels and tires were needed to get through the ruts, mud, and snow.  A running board served as a step to a vehicle's cabin, and sometimes could be wide enough to serve as a place to sit or even lie down for an adult.

During the 1920s and 1930s, car design was evolving rapidly to become more sleek and aerodynamic, which largely eliminated the need for running boards. The first automobile designed without running boards was the 1929 Ruxton, and the first by a high production manufacturer was the 1936 Cord. The Cord changed the attitude towards running boards for many years ahead.

Running boards may also be used to stand on while the vehicle is moving. The name running board is also given to safety appliances for walking on top of rail cars.

See also 
 Footplate
 Nerf bar
 Train surfing

References 

Automotive body parts
Rail technologies